Lieutenant-Colonel Hilary Hook (26 September 1917 – 14 September 1990) was a soldier in armies of the British Empire in India and later in Africa.

Hook was born on 26 September 1917 and was educated at Canford School, Dorset, and the Royal Military College, Sandhurst, after which he was commissioned into the Unattached List of the Indian Army on 27 January 1938. From 1 April 1938 he was attached to the 1st battalion the Queen's Regiment. He was admitted to the Indian Army on 27 November 1939 and posted to the Royal Deccan Horse (9th Horse). He was promoted lieutenant on 27 April 1940 and captain on 27 January 1946.

During the Second World War Hook served in New Guinea and Burma. He transferred to the 7th Hussars (later the Queen's Own Hussars) as a Captain on 28 June 1947. Later postings included Aden, Germany, Hong Kong, and the Sudan. He was promoted major on 27 January 1951 and finally retired the service as an honorary lieutenant-colonel on 13 October 1964.

Hook became famous with the British public in the 1980s as the result of a BBC documentary entitled Home from the Hill directed by Molly Dineen. This portrayed him as having led a full life of adventure in the British Empire, before coming home to an England which had changed out of all recognition to the one he remembered. Memorable scenes included Hook relaxing on the veranda of the game lodge he ran in Kenya while an African servant mowed the lawn, and back in England attempting to operate a kitchen appliance and voicing his displeasure at a pop music act on television.

The documentary was based on Hook's autobiographical book Home from the Hill, in which he describes participation in activities such as pig-sticking, elephant hunting and polo. It deals with the themes of colonialism, international development, and the end of the British Empire – in particular, through his alienation from the modern world having lived all his life in a vastly different culture. The phrase 'home from the hill' is from a line of Robert Louis Stevenson's poem "Requiem": Home is the sailor, home from sea, And the hunter home from the hill. 
  
On his return to England, Hook settled at Westbury, Wiltshire. On 12 June 1987, the night after the British General Election, he appeared on a memorable edition of After Dark on Channel 4.

He died in September 1990 at the age of 72.

See also
 Sudan Defence Force

References

 Molly Dineen's CV, with details of Home from the Hill documentary
 London Gazette (various dates)
 Indian Army List (various dates)
 The Half-Yearly Army List, February 1950

1917 births
1990 deaths
7th Queen's Own Hussars officers
British Indian Army officers
Graduates of the Royal Military College, Sandhurst
Indian Army personnel of World War II
People educated at Canford School
Queen's Own Hussars officers
Royal Tank Regiment officers